The arrondissement of Forbach-Boulay-Moselle is an arrondissement of France in the Moselle department in the Grand Est region. It has 169 communes.

Composition

The communes of the arrondissement of Forbach-Boulay-Moselle are:

Adaincourt
Adelange
Alsting
Altrippe
Altviller
Alzing
Anzeling
Arraincourt
Arriance
Bambiderstroff
Bannay
Baronville
Barst
Behren-lès-Forbach
Béning-lès-Saint-Avold
Bérig-Vintrange
Berviller-en-Moselle
Bettange
Betting
Bibiche
Biding
Bionville-sur-Nied
Bisten-en-Lorraine
Bistroff
Boucheporn
Boulay-Moselle
Bousbach
Boustroff
Bouzonville
Brettnach
Brouck
Brulange
Cappel
Carling
Château-Rouge
Chémery-les-Deux
Cocheren
Colmen
Condé-Northen
Coume
Créhange
Creutzwald
Dalem
Dalstein
Denting
Destry
Diebling
Diesen
Diffembach-lès-Hellimer
Ébersviller
Éblange
Eincheville
Elvange
Erstroff
Etzling
Falck
Farébersviller
Farschviller
Faulquemont
Filstroff
Flétrange
Folkling
Folschviller
Forbach
Fouligny
Freistroff
Frémestroff
Freybouse
Freyming-Merlebach
Gomelange
Gréning
Grostenquin
Guenviller
Guerstling
Guerting
Guessling-Hémering
Guinglange
Guinkirchen
Hallering
Ham-sous-Varsberg
Han-sur-Nied
Hargarten-aux-Mines
Harprich
Haute-Vigneulles
Heining-lès-Bouzonville
Hellimer
Helstroff
Hémilly
Henriville
Herny
Hestroff
Hinckange
Holacourt
Holling
Hombourg-Haut
L'Hôpital
Hoste
Kerbach
Lachambre
Landroff
Laning
Laudrefang
Lelling
Leyviller
Lixing-lès-Saint-Avold
Longeville-lès-Saint-Avold
Macheren
Mainvillers
Many
Marange-Zondrange
Maxstadt
Mégange
Menskirch
Merten
Metzing
Momerstroff
Morhange
Morsbach
Narbéfontaine
Neunkirchen-lès-Bouzonville
Niedervisse
Nousseviller-Saint-Nabor
Oberdorff
Obervisse
Œting
Ottonville
Petite-Rosselle
Petit-Tenquin
Piblange
Pontpierre
Porcelette
Racrange
Rémelfang
Rémering
Rosbruck
Roupeldange
Saint-Avold
Saint-François-Lacroix
Schœneck
Schwerdorff
Seingbouse
Spicheren
Stiring-Wendel
Suisse
Tenteling
Téterchen
Teting-sur-Nied
Théding
Thicourt
Thonville
Tritteling-Redlach
Tromborn
Vahl-Ebersing
Vahl-lès-Faulquemont
Vallerange
Valmont
Valmunster
Varize-Vaudoncourt
Varsberg
Vatimont
Vaudreching
Velving
Viller
Villing
Vittoncourt
Vœlfling-lès-Bouzonville
Voimhaut
Volmerange-lès-Boulay
Zimming

History

The arrondissement of Forbach-Boulay-Moselle was created in January 2015 by the merger of the former arrondissements of Forbach and Boulay-Moselle.

References

Forbach-Boulay-Moselle
States and territories established in 2015